Idotea metallica, also known as the metallic isopod, is a species of isopod in the family Idoteidae. It can be recognised by its metallic blue colouration and by the blunt, squared-off shape of the telson. It is found worldwide drifting on debris on high seas. It often gets blown inshore, where it is outcompeted by related species such as Idotea balthica.

References

Valvifera
Articles created by Qbugbot
Crustaceans described in 1802